The M.Zuiko Digital ED 40-150mm f/4.0-5.6 is a Micro Four Thirds System lens by Olympus Corporation. It is sold as a standalone item, and also as part of a kit along with bodies for all cameras in the Olympus PEN series (the discontinued E-P1 and the current E-P2, E-PL1, E-PL2, E-P3, E-PL3, E-PM1, E-PM2 and E-PL5).

The lens is available in black or silver. An updated "r" variant is available which appears to have identical basic characteristics and only minor cosmetic differences.

External links 
 Manufacturers page
 Four-Thirds consortium specifications
 Lens details
 R Variant

References

40-150mm f/4-5.6
Camera lenses introduced in 2010